Mikhaylovsky is a rural locality (a village) in Yermolkinsky Selsoviet, Belebeyevsky District, Bashkortostan, Russia. The population was 6 as of 2010. There are 4 streets.

Geography 
Mikhaylovsky is located 28 km northwest of Belebey (the district's administrative centre) by road. Maloalexandrovka is the nearest rural locality.

References 

Rural localities in Belebeyevsky District